The 2013 Maryland Terrapins football team represented the University of Maryland, College Park in the 2013 NCAA Division I FBS football season. The Terrapins were led by third-year head coach Randy Edsall and play their home games at Byrd Stadium. This marked the Terrapins' 61st and final season as a member of the Atlantic Coast Conference (ACC) and their ninth season in the ACC's Atlantic Division. They finished the season 7–6 overall and 3–5 in ACC play to place fifth in the Atlantic Division. They were invited to the Military Bowl, where they lost to Marshall.

Before the Season
On June 25, 2013 top ranked recruit and high school All-American, Derwin Gray, was declared academically ineligible for the 2013 season and will not enroll in school. He is planning to explore options with prep schools and junior colleges and eventually return to Maryland.

On August 3, 2013 sophomore running back Wes Brown was suspended for one year.  He will miss the entire 2013 season but he may be reinstated in time to join spring practices in 2014 should he comply with certain guidelines.  The suspension was handed out in conjunction with a series of offseason transgressions to include being a suspect in a shooting in Baltimore.

Schedule

Rankings

Game summaries
Games are broadcast on radio stations that are part of the Terrapin Sports Radio Network. Long-time broadcaster Johnny Holliday covers play-by-play, Tim Strachan provides color commentary, and former Terrapin quarterback Scott McBrien is the sideline reporter.

Florida International

 Sources: 

Maryland began its season at home taking on the FIU Panthers. Prior to this game, Maryland had won all of the previous three meetings between the two schools. The fourth meeting would have the same result.

C.J. Brown returned to quarterback the Terps for his first game since 2011, having missed all of 2012 with an ACL injury. He dominated against FIU, completing 20 of 23 passes, passing for 281 yards and 3 touchdowns, and rushing for 105 yards and two touchdowns. 98 of those passing yards went to sophomore Stefon Diggs, whose day included a 66-yard touchdown reception. Junior college transfer Deon Long made also his presence known with 110 receiving yards and a touchdown.

While C.J. Brown was the leading rusher, other players also contributed to the ground game. Running backs Albert Reid, Brandon Ross and Jaquille Veii had at least 8 carries each, and their contributions helped the Terps amass 251 yards on the ground. Kicker Brad Craddock connected on three field goals and was 4 for 5 on PAT attempts. The Maryland defense combined for five sacks and limited FIU to just ten points, all in the first half.

FIU quarterbacks Jack Medlock and E.J. Hilliard were able to combine for only 80 yards and no touchdowns, completing 10 of 22 pass attempts. The Panthers were able to score a touchdown with 8:30 left in the 2nd quarter and pull within 10 points, but Maryland responded and scored three more touchdowns before halftime to secure a 40–10 lead at the break. Craddock would add his third field goal early in the 4th quarter for the final margin of victory.

Old Dominion

 Sources:

Connecticut

 Sources: 

On September 16, Coach Randy Edsall announced that starting cornerback Dexter McDougle would miss the rest of the season following a shoulder injury suffered against Connecticut on September 14.  McDougle, a 5th year senior with no medical redshirt option, will see his playing career with the Terrapins come to an end.

West Virginia

 Sources:

Florida State

 Sources:

Personnel

Coaches

Notes:

Roster

(to be added)

Depth chart

References

Non-conference games: stats & game notes

Conference games: stats & game notes

Coach biographies

Other

Maryland
Maryland Terrapins football seasons
Maryland Terrapins football